Long Ago and Far Away may refer to:

 "Long Ago (and Far Away)", a popular song by Jerome Kern and Ira Gershwin from the 1944 film musical Cover Girl
 "Long Ago and Far Away (James Taylor song), 1971
 Long Ago and Far Away, a one-act play by David Ives, included in latter editions of All in the Timing
 Long Ago and Far Away (TV series), a public television series for children hosted by James Earl Jones
 Long Ago and Far Away (Charlie Watts album), 1996
 Long Ago and Far Away (Tony Bennett album), 1958
 Long Ago and Far Away (Charlie Haden and Brad Mehldau album), 2007
 Long Ago and Far Away: James Taylor, His Life and Music, a 2002 biography of James Taylor by Timothy White